Rock Show is a live album by Toadies.  It is a recording of the final show of the band's "Second Coming" reunion tour, recorded March 17, 2007 at the Greenville Avenue St. Patrick's Day parade in Dallas, Texas.  The album was recorded by DiscLive and released immediately following the show.  It is a limited edition CD-R with only 5000 copies having been burned. The album was later released to online music stores such as iTunes Store and Amazon MP3 on September 16, 2008 by Kirtland Records.

Track listing

Credits 
 Todd Lewis - vocals, guitar
 Mark Reznicek - drums
 Clark Vogeler - guitar
 Mark Hughes - bass
 Chris Hawkes - engineering, mixing, cover art

References 
 Track list

Toadies albums
2007 live albums